During the 2007–08 German football season, Werder Bremen competed in the Bundesliga.

Special kits

Season summary
Bremen failed to make a splash in European competition, being knocked out of the Champions League in the group stage before being eliminated from the UEFA Cup at the round of 16. There was better luck domestically, as the club finished runners-up.

Players

First-team squad
Squad at end of season

Left club during season

References

Notes

SV Werder Bremen
SV Werder Bremen seasons